Irish Broadband is a telecommunications company in Ireland providing wireless broadband services.

In April 2008, Imagine Communications Group acquired Irish Broadband from National Toll Roads and Kilsaran Concrete.

They are now the second largest provider of broadband in the Republic of Ireland after Eircom, with over 115,000 customers.

The company provides wireless broadband services for residential and business customers, including up to 4Mb symmetric DSL links (4:1 contention ratio). Services are provided by means of transmitters located on high points (e.g. tall buildings or hills).  these are located in the main cities in the Republic of Ireland, providing local services in those urban areas. Trading as NTR Broadband the company also provide broadband services in Northern Ireland.

Services
Breeze is a fixed wireless service, providing 2Mb, 3Mb and 4Mb speeds.

Ripwave is a "broadband in a box" service, providing speeds of 1Mb and 2Mb. However, most customers never get these speeds. It has also been plagued with problems regarding the quality of its signal.

Irish Broadband and Imagine also resell ADSL connectivity on the Eircom Bitstream network, offering ADSL speeds from 1Mb up to 12Mb.

Criticisms
Company representatives have stated that problems resulting in low service levels arose from rapid growth in customer numbers, with an increase of 1000% in one year. More recently, the company has increased the numbers of customer service agents employed in response to the increase in demand on the call centre. The company's backbone network has also been redesigned for scalability.

References

External links
 Irish Broadband homepage
 Imagine homepage

Internet service providers of the Republic of Ireland